Cheick Omar Traoré (born 31 March 1995) is a professional footballer who plays as a right-back for Ligue 2 club Dijon. Born in France, he plays for the Mali national team.

Early life 
In his youth, Cheick Traoré played along his brother Baba in his native Pierrefitte-sur-Seine. He is also a professional footballer.

Club career 
Traoré signed his first professional contract with Caen on 16 June 2015. He moved to Avranches on loan, and after a successful stint, was transferred to Châteauroux. Traoré worked his way into the starting lineup at Châteauroux and earned a transfer to Ligue 1 club Guingamp, and was loaned back to Châteauroux for the 2017–18 season. He made his professional debut for Châteauroux in a 3–2 Ligue 2 win over Brest on 28 July 2017.

From 2019 to 2021, Traoré was a Lens player, making a total of 15 appearances for the club. On 28 June 2021, he signed a three-year contract with Ligue 2 club Dijon.

International career
Born in France, Traoré is of Malian descent. He debuted for the Mali national team in a 2–1 friendly loss to South Africa on 13 October 2019.

Career statistics

References

External links
 
 
 
 
 Cheick Traoré at SM Caen 
 

1995 births
Living people
Footballers from Seine-Saint-Denis
Association football defenders
Malian footballers
Mali international footballers
French footballers
French people of Malian descent
Paris Saint-Germain F.C. players
Entente SSG players
CS Sedan Ardennes players
Stade Malherbe Caen players
US Avranches players
LB Châteauroux players
En Avant Guingamp players
RC Lens players
Dijon FCO players
Ligue 2 players
Championnat National 3 players
Championnat National players